Prunus debilis is a South American species of Prunus. Its phenotype suggests close affinity with three other South American species of Prunus; P. littlei, P. guanaiensis and  P. wurdackii. The Jivaro people chew the pulp of its fruit to alleviate the pain of toothaches.

References

debilis
Flora of Bolivia
Flora of Ecuador
Flora of Peru
Plants described in 1915
Medicinal plants